Dolly is an American variety show starring Dolly Parton that aired on ABC from September 27, 1987 to May 7, 1988. Guest stars included Tammy Wynette, Merle Haggard, Tyne Daly, Bruce Willis, Emmylou Harris, Linda Ronstadt, Tom Petty, Juice Newton, Tom Selleck, the Neville Brothers, Dudley Moore, and Oprah Winfrey. Tyne Daly's appearance on the show, in which she sang a duet with Parton, directly led to Daly being cast in the lead role in the 1989 Broadway production of Gypsy.

Production
On March 23, 1987, ABC-TV announced that it had signed Parton to star in a one-hour variety show set to begin airing in the fall. Banking on Parton's talent and appeal, ABC reportedly paid her   (equivalent to $ in )   for a two-year contract. To bolster the odds they brought in veteran variety show writers Buddy Sheffield, John Aylesworth, Jack Burns and producer Nick Vanoff. Parton also hired then-relatively-unknown Brett Butler as one of the writers. Bruce Vilanch and Fannie Flagg were also on the writing staff. The series began production on August 14 and the first episode premiered on September 27, ranking in the top five of the Nielsen ratings. 

The show was an attempt at a traditional variety show, featuring music, comedy skits and various guest stars. It had been roughly a decade since the last successful variety shows (The Carol Burnett Show, The Sonny & Cher Comedy Hour, and Cher) had gone off the air, and it was regarded as a gamble to try to revive the genre.  In 1976, Parton had starred in a successful syndicated variety show, also entitled Dolly, that she left after one season due to overwork and creative disputes; ABC offered Parton more creative control for this series and promoted it as "Dolly... Dolly's way."

Though most of the show's episodes were filmed at ABC's studio in Los Angeles, a number of special episodes were filmed on location, including Hawaii, New Orleans, Nashville, and a Thanksgiving episode in Parton's hometown of Sevierville, Tennessee.

Following a steady decline in ratings, ABC-TV announced that it had canceled the series on May 23, 1988, 16 days after the last episode aired.

Ratings
With 39.47 million viewers, the first episode of Dolly attracted the largest audience for any television series premiere. It was acknowledged that a great deal of talent and work went into producing the show, but the initially high ratings during the first few episodes steadily declined, and despite many format changes and other attempts to create interest, ratings did not improve. Halfway through the run, Parton, who retained creative control over the show, took command and jettisoned many of the lavish, splashy segments that she felt were not working in favor of a more "down home" feel. By this time, however, many of the initial viewers had already stopped watching.

Theme songs
The opening theme song was Parton's 1978 hit, "Baby I'm Burning", later to be replaced with "Hoedown-Showdown". As with her 1976 series, Parton closed each episode with her signature song, "I Will Always Love You."

Episodes

Home media
Time Life released the 19-disc box set Dolly: The Ultimate Collection – Deluxe Edition in September 2020 and it features a selection of 16 episodes of the series, marking the first time any episodes from the series have been released on DVD. 15 of the 16 episodes included are heavily edited due to copyright issues.

References

External links

1987 American television series debuts
1988 American television series endings
1980s American variety television series
1980s American music television series
American Broadcasting Company original programming
English-language television shows